Albert Campbell (17 April 1894 – 30 November 1961) was French-Cree (Métis) Canadian musher and trapper. He gained popularity as a Canadian "national hero" after winning the 1917 Red River Derby sled dog race.

Life 
Campbell was born in The Pas, Manitoba to the family of a Cree father John Campbell (1875 – 1917) and a French mother Adeline Beauchamp (1877 – ?).

However, he became best known in 1917 for winning the Red River Derby, the Winnipeg – Saint Paul  dog sled race, which was part of the Saint Paul Winter Carnival organized by the Saint Paul Outdoor Sports Carnival Association from 27 January to 3 February 1917. His younger brother Gabriel, who also competed in the race, finished in fourth place. According to Campbell, by this success he fulfilled the last wish of his father, who died two weeks before the race started. The race gained such widespread popularity that the Canadian government was reporting the news of the Campbell brothers' progress to the Canadian troops fighting overseas in the First World War.

Albert Campbell died on 30 November 1961. He is buried at Saint Mary's Cemetery in Winnipeg, Manitoba.

References

Sources 
 
 
 
 

Canadian dog mushers
1894 births
1961 deaths
Sportspeople from Manitoba
People from The Pas
Métis sportspeople
Persons of National Historic Significance (Canada)